Men of Texas is a 1942 American Western film directed by Ray Enright and starring Robert Stack and Broderick Crawford.

Plot
Chicago newspaper employees Sam Sawyer and Barry Conovan have been assigned to track down Sam Houston in Huntsville, Texas, unaware he died years before. Renegade guerrilla leader Henry Clay Jackson does not want Texas re-admitted as one of the United States, but is intent on restoring it as a republic. As he and his gang raid and loot Texas, Jackson believes himself to be following in the footsteps of Houston. When Jackson is about to be hanged for his crimes, Houston's ghost rises from his grave to tell Jackson he was wrong.

Cast
Robert Stack – Barry Conovan
Broderick Crawford – Henry Clay Jackson
Jackie Cooper – Robert Houston Scott
Anne Gwynne – Jane Baxter Scott
Ralph Bellamy – Major Lamphere
Jane Darwell – Mrs. Scott (Aunt Hattie)
Leo Carrillo – Sam Sawyer
John Litel – Colonel Scott
William Farnum – The ghost of Sam Houston
Janet Beecher – Mrs. Sam Houston
J. Frank Hamilton – Dwight Douglass
Kay Linaker – Mrs. Olsen

Production
The film was originally called Deep in the Heart of Texas and filming started May 1942.

Reception
The New York Times said it "provides ample entertainment."

References

External links
 
 
 
 

1942 films
1940s English-language films
American black-and-white films
American Western (genre) films
1942 Western (genre) films
Films directed by Ray Enright
Films scored by Edward Ward (composer)
Universal Pictures films
1940s American films